Zaur Pashayev (born August 31, 1983 in Jalilabad, Azerbaijan), is an Azerbaijani professional basketball player who currently plays for Kutaisi 2010 of the Georgian Superliga. He plays the point guard position. He is 1.88 m tall. He is member of Azerbaijan national basketball team.

Awards and accomplishments
Georgian Super League
Winner (1): (2016)
Runners-up (1): (2014)

References

External links
Superleague.ge Profile

1983 births
Living people
Azerbaijani men's basketball players
Point guards